Miss Burma is a national beauty pageant in Myanmar (Burma), and may mean:
 Miss Burma (1947–1962), the national beauty pageant in Burma 
 Miss Universe Myanmar (2013–present), the beauty pageant in Myanmar
 Miss Burma (2020), the new beauty pageant in 2020